, also known as Parodius, is a scrolling shooter video game developed by Konami for the MSX computer and was released in Japan. The game is notable for being the first title in the Parodius series, although it is often confused with its sequel Parodius! From Myth to Laughter. The name itself is a portmanteau of "Gradius" and "Parody" and, eponymously, the game is a parody of the Gradius series of space-based horizontally scrolling shooters. Many of the characters and enemies are derived from that famous shooter series, while other elements are extracted from other Konami titles, such as Antarctic Adventure and TwinBee. This game is of particular note in the series as being heavily infused with Japanese culture and folklore.

Gameplay
The gameplay is very similar to the Gradius games, with other aspects from games such as TwinBee. However, the characters are replaced with silly characters taken from either these or other Konami games, as well as Japanese culture. The music is mostly taken from classical music pieces.

The player can play as either Tako, an octopus, the Penguin (father of Pentarou) from Antarctic Adventure and the exclusive MSX game Penguin Adventure, Goemon from the Ganbare Goemon series, the Popolon knight from the MSX game Knightmare or the Vic Viper spaceship from Gradius. The game is composed of six stages consisting of various obstacles and enemies such as penguins and bees, as well as more traditional Gradius enemies such as moai. As with Gradius, the game utilizes a similar selection-bar based power-up system.

Reception
Parodius was awarded Best Game that Never Came out in the U.S. in 1992 by Electronic Gaming Monthly.

Ports
Parodius was later included in Konami Antiques MSX Collection Vol.3 for PlayStation, Konami Antiques MSX Collection Ultra Pack for Sega Saturn and Parodius Portable for PlayStation Portable with enhanced graphics.

In addition, it was released for mobile phones in December 2006 and for Wii Virtual Console on January 12, 2010, and Wii U on December 25, 2013, in Japan. Also, the MSX version was re-released for Windows PC on Online Store Project EGG on April 11, 2014, in Japan.

Notes

References

External links
Official Konami Mobile Minisite 
Official Konami Virtual Console Minisite 
Official Nintendo Wii U eshop Minisite 
Parodius: The Octopus Saves the Earth at IGN
Parodius: The Octopus Saves the Earth at GameFAQs

Parodius: The Octopus Saves the Earth at Hardcore Gaming 101 
Parodius: The Octopus Saves the Earth at Sakura (in Japanese)

1988 video games
D4 Enterprise games
Japan-exclusive video games
Mobile games
MSX games
Parodius
Horizontally scrolling shooters
Video games developed in Japan
Video games scored by Kinuyo Yamashita
Video games set on fictional planets
Video games set in outer space
Virtual Console games
Virtual Console games for Wii U
Windows games